Kočapar was the knez or župan of Duklja, a Serbian state, briefly in 1102–03 under the suzerainty of Grand Prince Vukan of Rascia. He was the son of Branislav, the Prince of Duklja. Following Bodin's death in 1101, Bodin's half-brother Dobroslav II succeeded him as king of Doclea. Kočopar, Bodin's first cousin once removed, travelled from Dyrrhachium to Rascia, forging an alliance with Vukan. This alliance would prove worthy in their successful invasion of Duklja in 1102. The battle that ensued at the Morača led to the overthrow of Dobroslav II and the coronation of Kočapar to the throne. Dobroslav was subsequently banished to Rascia and a large part of Dalmatia was pillaged in the process. Vukan gave Kočapar Duklja as a fief. The two would soon brake, with Vukan, sending a squad to Doclea (city), forcing Kočapar to flee to Bosnia and then Zahumlje where he also died.

See also
 Duklja
 Vojislavljević dynasty
 Vukanović dynasty
 Grand Principality of Serbia

References

Sources

 
 
 
 

12th-century Serbian royalty
Vojislavljević dynasty
Rulers of Duklja